The Orofino Historic District is a  historic district in Orofino, Idaho which was listed on the National Register of Historic Places in 1982.  It is bounded roughly by 2nd, Dewey, Main, Johnson, and 6th Sts. in Orofino.

It includes one- and two-story frame houses and commercial buildings developed during 1895–1932. It also includes several lime kilns.

The district's land was homesteaded by Clifford P. Fuller after the Nez Perce Indian Reservation was opened for homesteading in 1895, and his home is included.  His development company, the Clearwater Improvement Company, platted the town.

References

External links

Historic districts on the National Register of Historic Places in Idaho
Queen Anne architecture in Idaho
Colonial Revival architecture in Idaho
Clearwater County, Idaho
Lime kilns in the United States